Ukraine participated in Eurovision Song Contest 2007 with the song "Dancing Lasha Tumbai" written by Andriy Danylko. The song was performed by Verka Serduchka, which is the drag stage persona of Andriy Danylko. The Ukrainian broadcaster National Television Company of Ukraine (NTU) organised a national final in order to select the Ukrainian entry for the 2007 contest in Helsinki, Finland. Seven entries competed in the national selection held on 9 March 2007 and "Danzing" performed by Verka Serduchka was selected as the winner following the combination of votes from a five-member jury panel and a public televote. The song was later retitled as "Dancing Lasha Tumbai". The Ukrainian entry caused controversy due to Serduchka being a drag performer as well as alleged political references in the song.

As one of the ten highest placed finishers in 2006, Ukraine automatically qualified to compete in the final of the Eurovision Song Contest. Performing during the show in position 18, Ukraine placed second out of the 24 participating countries with 235 points.

Background 

The Ukrainian national broadcaster, National Television Company of Ukraine (NTU), broadcasts the event within Ukraine and organises the selection process for the nation's entry. NTU confirmed their intentions to participate at the 2007 Eurovision Song Contest on 19 January 2006. In the past, the broadcaster had alternated between both internal selections and national finals in order to select the Ukrainian entry. In 2005 and 2006, NTU had set up national finals with several artists to choose both the song and performer to compete at Eurovision for Ukraine, with both the public and a panel of jury members involved in the selection. Despite the Ukrainian broadcaster initially announcing that the 2007 Ukrainian entry would be internally selected, a national final was ultimately organised.

Before Eurovision

Evrobachennya 2007 - Natsionalyni vidbir 
The Ukrainian national final took place on 9 March 2007 at the NTU Studios in Kyiv. The show was hosted by Maria Orlova and Timur Miroshnychenko and broadcast on Pershyi Natsionalnyi.

Format 
The selection of the competing entries for the national final and ultimately the Ukrainian Eurovision entry took place over two stages. In the first stage, artists and songwriters had the opportunity to apply for the competition through an online submission form. Eight acts were selected and announced on 13 February 2007, one of them which was later withdrawn. The second stage was the televised final, which took place on 9 March 2007 and featured the remaining seven acts vying to represent Ukraine in Helsinki. The winner was selected via the 50/50 combination of votes from a public televote and an expert jury. Both the public televote and the expert jury assigned scores ranging from 1 (lowest) to 7 (highest) and the entry that had the highest number of points following the combination of these scores was declared the winner. Viewers participating in the public televote during the show had the opportunity to submit their votes for the participating entries via telephone or SMS. In the event of a tie, the tie was decided in favour of the entry that received the highest score from the jury.

Competing entries 
Artists and composers had the opportunity to submit their entries via an online submission form which accepted entries between 24 January 2007 and 10 February 2007. A five-member selection panel consisting of Volodymyr Hryshko (opera singer), Svyatoslav Vlokh (President of the World Dance Sport Federation), Oksana Novytska (Vice President of the Confederation of Designers and Stylists of Ukraine), Olena Mozgova (director of music and entertainment at NTU) and Vitaliy Dokalenko (general director of NTU) reviewed the 18 received submissions and shortlisted eight entries to compete in the national final. On 13 February 2007, the eight selected competing acts were announced. On 22 February 2007, Vitaliy Kozlovskiy withdrew from the national final due to disagreements with the format of the competition.

Final 
The final took place on 9 March 2007. Seven entries competed and the winner, "Danzing" performed by Verka Serduchka, was selected through the combination of votes from a public televote and an expert jury. Ties were decided in favour of the entries that received higher scores from the jury. The jury panel consisted of Yan Tabachnyk (composer), Svyatoslav Vlokh (President of the World Dance Sport Federation), Oksana Novytska (Vice President of the Confederation of Designers and Stylists of Ukraine), Olena Mozgova (director of music and entertainment at NTU) and Vitaliy Dokalenko (general director of NTU). 17,597 votes were registered by the televote during the show. In addition to the performances of the competing entries, Irina Bilyk, Natalia Mohylevska, 2003 Ukrainian Eurovision entrant Oleksandr Ponomaryov, 2006 Ukrainian Eurovision entrant Tina Karol, 2007 Belarusian Eurovision entrant Dmitry Koldun, 2007 Maltese Eurovision entrant Olivia Lewis, 2007 Polish Eurovision entrant The Jet Set and 2007 Romanian Eurovision entrants Todomondo performed as guests.

Controversy 
The choice of Verka Serduchka, a drag performer, as the Ukrainian Eurovision representative was fiercely criticized by several media and politicians of different parties. Taras Chornovil of the Party of Regions stated: "I guess some of our esteemed experts saw those "hot Finnish guys" dressed as monsters but didn't quite understand that there is subculture and there is pseudoculture. Those monsters are part of their subculture, which has the right to exist. But all these hermaphrodites have never been accepted anywhere. Therefore I think that this will be a serious embarrassment factor and the world will see us as complete idiots."

In addition, "Danzing" caused controversy due to the lyrics "Lasha Tumbai" being phonetically similar to "Russia goodbye", allegedly a reference to the Orange Revolution in Ukraine in 2004 and 2005. Serduchka clarified that "Lasha Tumbai" is a Mongolian phrase for "whipped cream", "milkshake" or "churned butter", although it was subsequently confirmed that there are no such words in Mongolian and that the catchphrase bears no meaning at all, and Serduchka would later confirm that there "Lasha Tumbai" was in fact meaningless, only chosen because she needed a rhyme for the song. "Danzing" was retitled as "Dancing Lasha Tumbai" for the Eurovision Song Contest.

At Eurovision
According to Eurovision rules, all nations except the "Big Four" (France, Germany, Spain and the United Kingdom), the host country, and the ten highest placed finishers in the 2006 contest are required to qualify from the semi-final in order to compete for the final; the top ten countries from the semi-final progress to the final. As one of the ten highest placed finishers in the 2006 contest, Ukraine automatically qualified to compete in the final on 12 May 2007. In addition to their participation in the final, Ukraine is also required to broadcast and vote in the semi-final on 10 May 2007. On 12 March 2007, a special allocation draw was held which determined the running order. As one of the three wildcard countries, Ukraine chose to perform in position 18 during the final, following the entry from Serbia and before the entry from the United Kingdom.

In Ukraine, both the semi-final and the final were broadcast on Pershyi Natsionalnyi with commentary by Timur Miroshnychenko. The Ukrainian spokesperson, who announced the Ukrainian votes during the final, was Kateryna Osadcha.

Final 

Verka Serduchka took part in technical rehearsals on 7 and 8 May, followed by dress rehearsals on 11 and 12 May. The Ukrainian performance featured Verka Serduchka performing on stage in a silver costume as well as sunglasses and a silver star hat designed by Anzhela Lysytsia, together with two dancers dressed in silver with military boots and tie and three backing vocalists, one of them which also played the accordion, dressed in gold and standing on raised platforms. The performers did a dance routine on a stage with flashing lights while disco balls and light projectors appeared on the LED screens. The two dancers that joined Verka Serduchka on stage were Sergey Ogurtsov and Tudor Zberea, while the three backing vocalists were Elena Romanovskaya, Natalia Gura-Golubovskaya and Vasily Goldakovskiy. Ukraine placed second in the final, scoring 235 points.

Voting 
Below is a breakdown of points awarded to Ukraine and awarded by Ukraine in the semi-final and grand final of the contest. The nation awarded its 12 points to Belarus in the semi-final and the final of the contest.

Points awarded to Ukraine

Points awarded by Ukraine

References

2007
Countries in the Eurovision Song Contest 2007
Eurovision